Legh Richmond Watts (December 12, 1843 – December 30, 1919) was an American lawyer. A veteran of the American Civil War, he served as president of the Portsmouth, Virginia city council, as president of the Virginia State Bar Association from 1914 to 1915, and as a member of the board of visitors of the University of Virginia.

References

1843 births
1919 deaths
Episcopalians from Virginia
People from Portsmouth, Virginia
University of Virginia School of Law alumni
Virginia Democrats
19th-century American Episcopalians
19th-century American lawyers
20th-century American Episcopalians
20th-century American lawyers